Nghtmre (stylized as NGHTMRE) is the self-titled debut EP by American DJ Nghtmre.

Track listing

Charts

References 

2016 debut EPs
Nghtmre albums